Eskihisar is a village in the Nusaybin District of Mardin Province in Turkey. The village is populated by Kurds of the Çomeran tribe and had a population of 162 in 2021.

The Monastery of Mar Awgin is located just east of Eskihisar.

References 

Villages in Nusaybin District
Kurdish settlements in Mardin Province